| current_members = Cody CanadaGrady CrossJeremy PlatoRandy Ragsdale
| past_members  = Matt Weidemann
}}

Cross Canadian Ragweed was an American rock band formed in Yukon, Oklahoma in 1994. The band consisted of Cody Canada (lead guitar/vocals), Grady Cross (guitar), Randy Ragsdale (drums), and Jeremy Plato (bass guitar). The group released five studio albums and three live albums from 1994 until 2010. The band was at the forefront of the rise of the red dirt music scene in Oklahoma and the Texas Music scene. After almost 15 years together, the group disbanded in 2010.

Formation
Cross Canadian Ragweed started when Randy Ragsdale and original bass guitar player Matt Weidemann, who had been playing in local bands together, met Cody Canada and Grady Cross who had also been playing together. The four had known each other since grade school and started playing together in Ragsdale's home seven nights a week under the tutelage of Ragsdale's father Johnny, who had worked with musical artists in the area. After playing together, the band officially formed by combining a part of every band member's last name, coming up with the name Cross Canadian Ragweed. Weidemann left the group shortly after and Jeremy Plato joined to play the bass guitar. After finishing high school, the band moved to the College Town of Stillwater, Oklahoma, where acts like Mike McClure's The Great Divide and singer-songwriter Jimmy LaFave had established enough of a local scene to earn Stillwater the nickname North Austin.

Carney and Live And Loud at the Wormy Dog Saloon
The group had already received significant college radio airplay before it released its first album, Carney in 1998 on their own independent label. Initially, selling the band in the market it was based in, was considered by music observers to be far-fetched; however, the fan base's passion and loyalty to the band allowed them to find success in releasing that first album. Carney was well received, then the band released Live and Loud at the Wormy Dog Saloon in 1999, which was also well received, especially in the local scene.

Highway 377
Ragweed released its second studio album Highway 377 in 2001, though it was recorded in 1999. It propelled them into wider audience and into Texas, where Canada was born and also where the band had been touring heavily. Though not a released single, the song "Long Way Home" was featured on several Dodge Truck Commercials in both Texas and Oklahoma which added to the popularity of the band. The band paid tribute to drummer Randy Ragsdale's father Johnny, who has passed away from cancer in 1997 with the track "Johnny's Song."

Live and Loud at Billy Bob's Texas
In 2002 Ragweed recorded the popular live album Live and Loud at Billy Bob's Texas in Fort Worth, Texas. The songs were mainly live versions of songs off Carney and Highway 377, with a handful of cover songs.

Cross Canadian Ragweed (Purple Album)
In 2002, the group then signed with Universal South Records and released a self-titled album also alternately known as 'The Purple Album'.  It was a tribute to the band's "little sister" Mandy Ragsdale, the younger sister of the band's drummer Randy Ragsdale, who had died in an auto accident near College Station, Texas, and whose favorite color was purple. The album produced charted singles "17" and the ballad "Constantly", and released a music video for the hard rock track "Don't Need You."

Soul Gravy
Ragweed's 2004 album, Soul Gravy, debuted at No. 4 on the Billboard charts. Lee Ann Womack provided background vocals on the popular single "Sick and Tired". The project also saw the re-release of the song "Alabama" (off of 2001's Highway 377) with a heavier electric sound, which appeared on the Billboard Charts as well.

Garage
In October 2005 the band released Garage, described by both the band and raters at AllMusic as the group's "grungiest album ever." Two songs, "Fighting' For" and "This Time Around" both became hits off the album. The album charted higher than any studio album the band ever released and for the first time, the band broke into rock radio airplay across the United States due to the song "Dimebag", a tribute to former Damageplan and Pantera guitarist "Dimebag" Darrell Abbott, who had been killed months earlier during a concert, in addition to a heavier rock sound overall.

Back To Tulsa: Live And Loud At Cain's Ballroom
In late 2006, Ragweed released their third and final live album, Live and Loud At Cain's Ballroom in Tulsa, Oklahoma. The band's 24 song project was well received and featured songs from their previous projects The Purple Album, Soul Gravy, and Garage. It also featured a handful of covers as well such as Neil Young's The Needle and the Damage Done and Robert Earl Keen's "Lonely Feeling."

Mission California
Cross Canadian Ragweed recorded Mission California, their fourth studio album, at the end of March 2007. The namesake of the album was due to the recording taking place in San Diego, California. The band spent 25 days in the studio; the first 5 cutting 15 tracks, the next 20 polishing each. Lee Ann Womack once again laid down background vocals on 4 of the tracks to include the Chris Knight cover "Cry Lonely." Mission California was released on October 2, 2007. AllMusic reviewed the Album and found that the project was "name appropriately, the band sounds much more a progressive West Coast sound in many of the tracks and less rural rock."

Happiness and All the Other Things
The band's tenth and final album, Happiness and All the Other Things was released on August 31, 2009, commemorating the band's 15th Anniversary. It featured 12 new studio tracks and three live tracks. Recorded in California, this album includes a track entitled "51 Pieces", which Canada penned with Micky Braun. The song was based on an incident where Ohio State police ransacked the band's bus after a stop in Cleveland at the House of Blues. It also featured "Blue Bonnets" which is dedicated to Cody's oldest son Dierks. Happiness and All the Other Things was officially dedicated to the late Randall Locke (Willie Nelson's long-time stage manager) who suddenly died on May 6, 2009. Other popular tracks were "To Find My Love", "Burn Like The Sun", and "Kick In The Head."

Hiatus and band break-up 
In May 2010, Cross Canadian Ragweed announced a hiatus from touring.  In a band press release, Ragsdale explained, "Right now, I need to be at home for my family, particularly my son JC, who has autism. He's 10 years old now and still struggling in his development. I feel the only way I can help him is to be more hands on and close to home." Despite Ragsdale wanting to "get another drummer and press on," Canada stated "We’ve always said from the start, we’re Ragweed as the four of us, or not Ragweed at all." In September 2010, Canada officially announced the band was calling it quits by announcing their  "Last Call Show" in October 2010 at Joe's Bar in Chicago, IL, stating "as far as that’s concerned, Oct 24 is the last one, the last gig."

Post break-up 
Since Cross Canadian Ragweed, Canada and Plato formed The Departed with fellow Yukon-native Dave Bowen (drums), Seth James (guitar), and Steve Littleton (keyboards), releasing their debut album "This Is Indian Land" in June 2011.
Ragsdale and Cross both returned to Yukon. Ragsdale played with Stoney LaRue until 2013 and now works in the oil and natural gas industry, while Cross purchased and operates the bar that was the very first venue Cross Canadian Ragweed performed in 1994.
In 2019 Grady Cross and Randy Ragsdale joined singer-songwriter Jason Young to form the band Cross Rags and Young.

Influences and sound
The band was influenced by grunge, alternative rock of the 1990s along with early southern rock acts as well as outlaw country. Canada said that rock bands such as Nirvana, Pearl Jam, Stone Temple Pilots, AC/DC, and Soundgarden all were a part of the influence on the band's sound as well as country music influences Merle Haggard, Willie Nelson, and Robert Earl Keen, in addition to southern rockers Marshall Tucker Band, and Lynyrd Skynyrd, among others. Due to their unique sound, the band often had a hard time getting radio airplay on either mainstream rock or country stations.

Notable appearances
The band frequently played with other stars of the Red Dirt and Texas Music scene including Stoney Larue, Micky & The Motorcars, Reckless Kelly, (Canada's brother-in-law) Wade Bowen, No Justice, Johnny Cooper, Seth James, and Brandon Rhyder.

The band played with country music star Dierks Bentley numerous times. Bentley referenced the band in his song "Free and Easy (Down the Road I Go)", singing that "Ragweed's rockin' on the radio".

Minnesota Twins catcher Ryan Doumit comes to bat to their song "Alabama".

"Cry Lonely" is a playable track in Rock Band Country Track Pack.

The song "Boys from Oklahoma" plays as the credits roll in the movie Leaves of Grass starring Edward Norton and Susan Sarandon. The film is a Stoner Comedy set in Oklahoma.

"Anywhere But Here" is played during the Season 2 Episode 6 of the NBC television series Grimm.

Discography

Studio albums

Live albums

Singles

Music videos

References

External links
 Cross Canadian Ragweed's Official Web Site

American alternative country groups
Musical groups from Oklahoma
American country rock groups
Show Dog-Universal Music artists
Musical groups established in 1994
People from Yukon, Oklahoma
1994 establishments in Oklahoma